Gypsy is a 1962 American musical comedy-drama film produced and directed by Mervyn LeRoy. The screenplay by Leonard Spigelgass is based on the book of the 1959 stage musical Gypsy: A Musical Fable by Arthur Laurents, which was adapted from the 1957 autobiography Gypsy: A Memoir by Gypsy Rose Lee. Stephen Sondheim wrote the lyrics for songs composed by Jule Styne. The film was remade for television in 1993.

Plot
Determined to make her beautiful, gifted daughter June a vaudeville headliner, willful, resourceful and domineering stage mother Rose Hovick will stop at nothing to achieve her goal. She drags June and her shy, awkward, and decidedly less-talented older sister Louise around the country in an effort to get them noticed, and with the help of agent Herbie Sommers, finally manages to secure a booking on the prestigious Orpheum Circuit.

Years pass, and the girls no longer are young enough to pull off the childlike personae their mother insists they continue projecting. June rebels, and elopes with Gerry, one of the dancers who backs their act. When the other dancers discover this, they also leave, presuming the act is finished. Devastated by what she sees as betrayal, Rose pours all her energy into making a success of Louise, despite her obvious lack of skill as a performer. Not helping matters is the increasing popularity of sound films, which leads to a decline in the demand for stage entertainment. Herbie sticks with mother and daughter through their struggles, vainly hoping that Rose will one day quit show-business and settle down with him. With bookings scarce, they find themselves in Wichita, Kansas, where a third-rate burlesque house books their act in hopes of keeping the vice squad at bay.

Rose appears to mature while at the burlesque house, deciding that this will be their last booking and suggesting that she and Herbie finally marry. However, when one of the strippers is arrested for shoplifting, Rose is unable to resist offering Louise as her replacement. Louise reluctantly agrees to go through with it, though it's clear she's only doing it to please her mother. This becomes the final straw for Herbie, as he is disgusted at the lengths Rose will go as a stage mother and realizes that she will never marry him. He offers her one chance to give him a reason to stay, and when she fails, he leaves her for good. At first, Louise's voice is shaky and her moves tentative, but she gains confidence as audiences respond to her, eventually blossoming as an entertainer billed as Gypsy Rose Lee. Exasperated by her mother's constant interference in both her life and wildly successful career, Louise finally confronts Rose and demands she leave her alone. Understanding that she has spent her life enslaved by a desperate need to be noticed and has driven everyone away, an angry, bitter, and bewildered Rose stumbles onstage at the deserted theatre and experiences an emotional breakdown. Realizing Louise witnessed this, Rose admits she tried to live vicariously through her and June, allowing her to reconcile with her daughter.

Cast
 Rosalind Russell as Rose Hovick 
 Natalie Wood as Louise Hovick / Gypsy Rose Lee
 Karl Malden as Herbie Sommers 
 Paul Wallace as Tulsa
 Morgan Brittany (billed as Suzanne Cupito) as Baby June 
 Ann Jillian as Dainty June / June Havoc
 Diane Pace as Baby Louise 
 Parley Baer as Mr. Kringelein 
 Harry Shannon as Grandpa 
 Betty Bruce as Tessie Tura
 Faith Dane as Mazeppa 
 Roxanne Arlen as Electra
 Jean Willes as Betty Cratchitt
 George Petrie as George
 Ben Lessy as Mervyn Goldstone
 Guy Raymond as Pastey
 Louis Quinn as Cigar
 Lisa Kirk as Rose Hovick (singing voice) (uncredited)
 Harvey Korman as Gypsy's Press Agent (uncredited)
 Jack Benny as Himself (uncredited)
 Danny Lockin as Gerry (uncredited)
 Bert Michaels as Yonkers (uncredited)

Musical numbers

 Overture – Orchestra, conducted by Jule Styne
 "Small World" – Rose
 "Some People" – Rose
 "Baby June and Her Newsboys" – Baby June, Chorus
 "Mr. Goldstone, I Love You" – Rose and chorus
 "Little Lamb" – Louise
 "You'll Never Get Away From Me" – Rose, Herbie
 "Dainty June and Her Farmboys" – Dainty June, Chorus
 "If Mama Was Married" – June, Louise
 "All I Need Is the Girl" – Tulsa
 "Everything's Coming Up Roses" – Rose
 "Together Wherever We Go" – Rose, Herbie, Louise
 "You Gotta Have a Gimmick" – Tessie Tura, Mazeppa, Electra
 "Small World" (Reprise) –  Rose
 "Let Me Entertain You" – Louise
 "Rose's Turn" – Rose

"Together Wherever We Go" was deleted prior to the film's release, although it was included on the soundtrack album, and "You'll Never Get Away From Me" was abbreviated to a solo for Rose following the initial run. In the DVD release of the film, both numbers – taken from a 16-millimeter print of inferior quality – are included as bonus features.

Production
Rosalind Russell and her husband, theatre producer Frederick Brisson, were hoping to do a straight dramatic version of the story based directly on the memoir by Gypsy Rose Lee, but the book was irrevocably tied up in the rights to the play. Coincidentally, Russell had just starred in the film version of the Leonard Spigelgass play A Majority of One at Warner Bros., which Brisson had produced, and all parties came together to make Gypsy, with Russell starring, LeRoy directing, and Spigelgass writing the highly faithful adaptation of the Arthur Laurents stage book.

Although Russell had starred and sung in the 1953 stage musical Wonderful Town and the 1955 film The Girl Rush, the Gypsy score was beyond her. Her own gravelly singing voice was artfully blended with that of contralto Lisa Kirk. Kirk's ability to mimic Russell's voice is showcased in the final number "Rose's Turn", which is a clever blend of both of their voices. Kirk's full vocal version was released on the original soundtrack, although it is not the version used in the finished film. In later years, Russell's original tryout vocals were rediscovered on scratchy acetate discs and included as bonus tracks on the CD reissue of the film's soundtrack.

Marni Nixon had dubbed Natalie Wood's singing voice in West Side Story the previous year, but Wood did her own singing in Gypsy. While Wood recorded a separate version of "Little Lamb" for the soundtrack album, in the film she sang the song "live" on the set. Other songs performed live were "Mr. Goldstone, I Love You" and the reprise of "Small World", both sung by Russell (not Kirk).

Reaction

Critical reception
Film historian Douglas McVay observed in his book The Musical Film, "Fine as West Side Story is, though, it is equaled and, arguably, surpassed - in a rather different idiom - by another filmed Broadway hit: Mervyn LeRoy’s Gypsy. Arthur Laurents' book (for) West Side Story (adapted for the screen by Ernest Lehman), though largely craftsmanlike, falls short of his libretto for Gypsy (scripted on celluloid by Leonard Spigelgass), based on the memoirs of the transatlantic stripper Gypsy Rose Lee. The dialogue and situations in Gypsy have more wit, bite and emotional range, and the characterizations are more complex."

Variety noted, "There is a wonderfully funny sequence involving three nails-hard strippers which comes when Gypsy has been unreeling about an hour. The sequence is thoroughly welcome and almost desperately needed to counteract a certain Jane One-Note implicit in the tale of a stage mother whose egotisms become something of a bore despite the canny skills of director-producer Mervyn LeRoy to contrive it otherwise. Rosalind Russell's performance as the smalltime brood-hen deserves commendation ... It is interesting to watch [Natalie Wood] ... go through the motions in a burlesque world that is prettied up in soft-focus and a kind of phony innocence. Any resemblance of the art of strip, and its setting, to reality is, in this film, purely fleeting."

Box office performance
Gypsy was a financial success. Produced on a budget of $4 million, the film grossed $11,076,923 at the box office, earning $6 million in US theatrical rentals. It was the 8th highest-grossing film of 1962.

Awards and nominations

The film is recognized by American Film Institute in these lists:
 2004: AFI's 100 Years...100 Songs:
 "Everything's Coming up Roses" - Nominated
 2006: AFI's Greatest Movie Musicals - Nominated

Home media
Warner Home Video released the Region 1 DVD on May 2, 2000. The film is in anamorphic widescreen format with an audio track in English and subtitles in English and French.

The Region 2 DVD was released on December 6, 2006. The film is in fullscreen format with audio tracks in French and English and subtitles in French.

Gypsy is one of six films included in the box set The Natalie Wood Collection released on February 3, 2009.

Gypsy was released on Blu-ray Disc through the Warner Archive Collection on November 20, 2012.

See also
 List of American films of 1962
 Gypsy (1993 film)

References

External links

 
 
 
 
 

1962 films
1960s biographical films
1960s musical comedy-drama films
American biographical films
American musical comedy-drama films
1960s English-language films
Films about entertainers
Films based on biographies
Films based on musicals
Films based on works by Stephen Sondheim
Films directed by Mervyn LeRoy
Films featuring a Best Musical or Comedy Actress Golden Globe winning performance
Musical films based on actual events
Films about striptease
Warner Bros. films
Cultural depictions of actors
Cultural depictions of dancers
Cultural depictions of American women
1962 comedy films
1962 drama films
1960s American films